Laicita Worden Gregg (1892–1975) was an American artist who created murals for the Works Progress Administration (WPA). 

Gregg née Worden was born in Philadelphia, Pennsylvania on September 25, 1892. She attended the Pennsylvania Academy of Fine Arts. In 1919 she married Kenneth Philbrick Gregg. She painted murals for the WPA that were installed in locations in Connecticut; the New Canaan High School, the New Canaan Library, the Stamford Court House, and public schools in Weston, Connecticut and Wilton, Connecticut. She also painted a three panel mural of the The Regicides for a school in New Haven, Connecticut. That mural was restored by the New Haven Museum and Historical Society. Gregg died in Rutland, Vermont on August 26, 1975.

References

External links
 
 Laicita Gregg:Connecticut WPA artist Images posted by the Connecticut State Library on Flickr 
  with photo of headstone
 

1892 births
1975 deaths
American women artists
Federal Art Project artists